Newbill is a surname. Notable people with the surname include:

D. J. Newbill (born 1992), American basketball player
Ivano Newbill (born 1970), American basketball player
Richard Newbill (born 1968), American football linebacker